The 2021–22 Syed Mushtaq Ali Trophy was the fourteenth season of the Syed Mushtaq Ali Trophy, a Twenty20 cricket tournament played in India. It was contested by 38 teams, divided into six groups, with six teams in Group D. The tournament was announced by BCCI on 3 July 2021.

Gujarat won four of their five matches, with Kerala winning three matches. Therefore, Gujarat advanced to the quarter-finals and Kerala progressed to the preliminary quarter-finals by winning their last league match against Madhya Pradesh.

Points table

Fixtures
Source:

Round 1

Round 2

Round 3

Round 4

Round 5

References

2021 in Indian cricket
Domestic cricket competitions in 2021–22